Robert Heath (14 August 1816 – 7 October 1893) was a British Conservative Party politician.

Heath was educated at Dr Magnus's School at Etruria Hall before leaving education at age 14 and joining his father's firm, Clough Hall Collieries and Ironworks. on his father's death in 1849, he became manager. However, in 1854 he resigned this role and joined the development of Silverdale and Kunthon Forges, under Stainer & Heath. He retired from active business in 1886.

Heath was elected MP for Stoke-upon-Trent in 1874, but lost the seat in 1880.

References

External links
 

Conservative Party (UK) MPs for English constituencies
UK MPs 1874–1880
1816 births
1893 deaths